Apachita (Aymara for the place of transit of an important pass in the principal routes of the Andes; name for a stone cairn in the Andes, a little pile of rocks built along the trail in the high mountains, "three streams (or crevices)", also spelled Apacheta) is a  mountain in the Bolivian Andes. It is located in the La Paz Department, Inquisivi Province, Colquiri Municipality. Apachita lies southwest of Kimsa Q'awa.

References 

Mountains of La Paz Department (Bolivia)